ZHS may refer to:

 Germany
 Zentrale Hochschulsportanlage, the biggest university sports facility in Germany

 United States
 Zachary High School, a high school in Zachary, Louisiana
 Zanesville High School, a high school in Zanesville, Ohio
 Zephyrhills High School, a high school in Zephyrhills, Florida
 Zillah High School, a high school in Zillah, Washington State
 Zuni High School, a public high school in Zuni, New Mexico
 Zumberge Hall of Science, a building in the University of Southern California